John Richard Greenwell (2 January 1884 – 20 November 1942) was an English football manager and former player. He is Barcelona's longest serving manager, having coached the club for ten consecutive seasons (initially as player-coach, then as manager), later returning to coach for two more seasons in the 1930s. In 1939, Greenwell became the only non-South American coach to date to win the South American Championship when he guided Peru to their first win. He also served as a manager with CD Castellón, RCD Español, Valencia CF, Sporting de Gijón, Real Sociedad Alfonso XIII, Universitario de Deportes and Independiente Santa Fe.

Playing career
Jack Greenwell was born in Crook, County Durham, on 2 January 1884. The son of a miner, he became a miner himself after leaving school and played as a wing-half for Crook Town of the English Northern League from the age of 17. He also played with West Auckland Town as a guest player in their Sir Thomas Lipton Trophy success in 1909.

He made his debut as player for Barcelona on 29 September 1912 in a 4–2 win over FC Espanya de Barcelona. Following the departure of Jack Alderson, Greenwell became the club's new player-coach. In 1913, Greenwell arranged for his former team Crook Town to play a series of games against Barcelona. The visiting English team beat them 4–2 and then held them to 1–1 and 2–2 draws. Together with a very young Paulino Alcántara, Francisco Bru and Romà Forns, Greenwell subsequently helped Barcelona win the Catalan championship in 1912–13 and 1915–16.

Managerial career

In Spain
After retiring as a player, he was appointed manager of Barcelona by the club president, Joan Gamper, and made his managerial debut on 7 July 1917 in a 3–1 win over CE Europa. He would eventually take charge of the club for 492 games and coached the club during their first "golden age". He survived early calls for his resignation after experimenting with Alcántara as a defender and went on to lead the club to four Campionats de Catalunya and two Copas del Rey. As well as Alcántara, the Barça team under Greenwell also included Sagibarba, Ricardo Zamora, Josep Samitier, Félix Sesúmaga and Ferenc Plattkó. At Barcelona, Greenwell was noted for his innovative approach to tactics, focussing on developing a passing game and building attacks from the back rather than concentrating on dribbling past opponents.

After leaving Barcelona in 1923, Greenwell became the inaugural manager UE Sants, a club based in the Sants district of Barcelona. During his three seasons with the club, he helped them stave off relegation in his first season, and finish third in the league in his last season, while also finally prevailing over his former team. Greenwell then joined CD Castellón, who played in the Campeonato Regional de Valencia. In the 1926–27 season, the club finished as runners-up, and the following season, they repeated the same feat, but Greenwell did not see the season out as he moved mid-season to Barcelona's local rivals Español. In 1928, he led them into the inaugural La Liga, but the club only managed to finish seventh. However, Español made up for their disappointing league form by winning both the Campionat de Catalunya and their first ever Copa del Rey in 1929. With a team that included Zamora and Ricardo Saprissa, Greenwell guided Español through the early rounds, beating Sporting de Gijón and Arenas Club de Getxo. In the quarter finals, they beat Athletic Madrid 9–3 on aggregate, before beating eventual La Liga champions Barcelona 3–1 in the semi-finals and Real Madrid 2–1 in the final. Greenwell remained in charge of Español for one more season, but failed to win another trophy. He then spent a season with Real Sociedad Alfonso XIII, where the club retained the Baleares Championship.

Greenwell returned to Barcelona for two further seasons in 1931, and guided the club to a fifth Campionat de Catalunya in 1931–32. After leaving Barcelona for a second time, Greenwell joined Valencia for the 1933–34 season. The club only finished seventh in La Liga but won the Campeonato de Valencia and reached the Copa de España final. The game saw Greenwell face old acquaintances Samitier and Zamora, now playing for Real Madrid. The Madrid club, at the time known as Madrid CF, beat Valencia 2–1 in the final. The 1935–36 season would prove to be the last time he managed a Spanish club, finishing in the Segunda División with Sporting de Gijón and missing out on promotion to La Liga.

In South America
Greenwell, along with his English wife Doris (née Rubinstien), fled the Spanish Civil War. After briefly coaching in Turkey, he went to Peru in 1939, as manager of both Universitario de Deportes and the Peruvian national team. He coached Universitario as they won the national championship. The same year saw Peru host the South American Championship. Colombia, Argentina, Bolivia and Brazil all withdrew before the competition started, so the remaining five countries, Chile, Ecuador, Paraguay, Uruguay and Peru formed a single mini-league with each team playing all the others once. Uruguay and Peru both won their first three games so when they met in the final round, the game was effectively a final. Peru won 2–1 and became South American champions.

In 1940, Greenwell moved to the Colombian port city of Barranquilla, and worked with the Colombia national team in their build-up to the 1942 Central American and Caribbean Games. However, the city's games were postponed due to the worsening political situation during World War II, eventually being held in 1946.

In 1942, he joined Independiente Santa Fe, with whom he reached the finals of the Torneo de Cundinamarca (at the time there was no First Division in Colombia), which the team lost against América de Cali. Later that year, he died there of a heart attack whilst driving home from a training session. He was survived by his wife and their daughter, Carmen.

Honours

As player
Crook Town
Crook and District League: 1902

West Auckland
Sir Thomas Lipton Trophy: 1909

Barcelona
Campionat de Catalunya: 1912–13, 1915–16

As manager
Barcelona
 Copa del Rey: 1920, 1922
 Campionat de Catalunya: 1918–19, 1919–20, 1920–21, 1921–22, 1931–32

RCD Español
 Copa del Rey: 1928–29
 Campionat de Catalunya: 1928–29

Real Sociedad Alfonso XIII
 Baleares Championship: 1930–31

Valencia CF
 Campeonato de Valencia: 1933–34

Universitario
 Peruvian Primera División: 1939

Peru
 South American Championship: 1939
 Bolivarian Games: 1938

References

External links
Greenwell at www.crooktownafc.co.uk
Jack Greenwell (history as Barça's first official coach)
Greenwell at Valencia CF
 La Liga stats
Greenwell at Universitario de Deportes

1884 births
1942 deaths
CD Castellón managers
Crook Town A.F.C. players
English footballers
English football managers
English expatriate football managers
English expatriate sportspeople in Spain
English expatriate sportspeople in Colombia
English expatriate sportspeople in Peru
Expatriate football managers in Colombia
Expatriate football managers in Spain
Expatriate football managers in Peru
La Liga managers
FC Barcelona players
FC Barcelona managers
People from Crook, County Durham
Footballers from County Durham
Peru national football team managers
RCD Espanyol managers
RCD Mallorca managers
Sporting de Gijón managers
Club Universitario de Deportes managers
Valencia CF managers
Association football wing halves
UE Sants managers